Bradina tormentifera is a moth in the family Crambidae. It was described by Edward Meyrick in 1929. It is found on the Marquesas Islands in the southern Pacific Ocean.

References

Moths described in 1929
Bradina